Kinsey Millhone is a fictional character created by the American author Sue Grafton (1940–2017) for her "alphabet mysteries" series of 25 best-selling novels which debuted in 1982. Millhone, a former police officer turned private investigator, also appears in a number of short stories written by Grafton.

Grafton's mystery novels featuring Millhone are set in 1980s Santa Teresa, a fictionalized town based on Santa Barbara, California.

Biography
The fictional character Kinsey Millhone was born on May 5, 1950. Her unusual first name was the maiden name of her mother, wealthy debutante Rita Cynthia Kinsey, who married Kinsey's father, Randy Millhone, against the wishes of Kinsey's grandmother, Cornelia LaGrand Kinsey ("Grand"), causing a family rift. Kinsey's parents were killed in a car wreck when she was five; Kinsey was trapped in the car with her dead parents for several hours before she was rescued, retaining only the memory of her mother weeping softly before her death. She then moved in with her mother's sister Virginia ("Aunt Gin"), the only relative to side with Rita in the family rift, although Kinsey later finds out her parents were en route to a bridge-building family visit when the accident occurred. From her Aunt Gin, Kinsey acquired various eccentricities, including a liking for peanut-butter and pickle sandwiches. In high school, Kinsey was a self-described pot-smoking delinquent. After three semesters at the local community college she realized that academic life was not for her and she joined the Santa Teresa police force. After two years, Kinsey decided life in uniform wasn't for her, either, and quit the police force to become an investigator for California Fidelity, an insurance company, where Aunt Gin had worked. Eventually, she became a self-employed private investigator, initially mentored by local PI Benjamin Byrd, who had been a partner of another local PI, Morley Shine, before striking out on her own, solving various disappearances and murders, clearing names and dodging hitmen. For some years she maintained a loose relationship with CFI, then rented premises in the offices of her lawyer, Lonnie Kingman, before renting independent office space in later years. She has an antagonistic relationship with local policeman Con Dolan, although this mellowed into a reasonably amicable truce after Dolan's retirement and they have co-operated on more than one recent case.

Kinsey is described as 5'6" tall, and weighs about 118 pounds. She has short, dark, thick hair that she trims with nail scissors, being generally uninterested in her physical appearance. She is, however, very particular about her teeth, and even mentions other people's good teeth (especially men to whom she might be attracted). Her wardrobe consists mostly of jeans and turtleneck sweaters, though she also owns an extremely wrinkle-resistant "little black dress" for those occasions when dressing up is unavoidable. She does, however, place a great premium on physical fitness and jogs three miles every weekday. At the same time, she has a "penchant for junk food." She also suffers from tinnitus, caused when she shot an attacker from inside a trash can. Kinsey has been divorced twice. Her first husband, Mickey, an ex-cop, appears in O is for Outlaw. Her second husband, Daniel, a struggling musician, appears in E is for Evidence, where he is revealed to be attracted to men. In most ways, Kinsey is a loner. She has no children and lives in an extremely compact studio apartment converted from a single-car garage. Her landlord is a young-at-heart octogenarian, Henry Pitts, a retired commercial baker who enjoys creating crossword puzzles; Kinsey admits to having a crush on Henry, but also says he is the closest thing she will have to a father. Henry's family is long-lived, his siblings all being well into their 90s. When not dining on fast food, Kinsey eats regularly at a local tavern, run by flamboyant Hungarian Rosie, who, in the course of the stories, marries Henry's hypochondriac brother, William.

Kinsey has had several relationships in the series, beginning with Charlie Scorsoni, then Jonah Robb, a police officer, and Robert Dietz, another private eye, until the later novels in which she began an affair with longtime friend Cheney Phillips, a police detective. Kinsey remains friends with Cheney after their split, as she did for a while with Jonah, though Jonah slowly drops out of her life after patching up his on-off marriage. Dietz, on the other hand, loses touch with her for long periods of time, returning briefly in M is for Malice and also in W is for Wasted. In each book, we see Kinsey torn by her yearning for him to be a constant presence.

Having lived for most of her life with very few family members (for most of the series, her "family" consisted of Henry and his siblings, Rosie, and the generous-natured employees in nearby offices), Kinsey received a shock when she found out about the Kinsey clan. When she met cousins Tasha and Lisa, she realized the three are very similar in appearance. Kinsey and Tasha formed a business relationship in M Is for Malice and Kinsey was instinctively attached to Tasha's mother, her aunt Susanna, when they met. However, she has remained reluctant to become involved with her new-found family, feeling that they abandoned her when she was orphaned. However, in U is for Undertow she discovers that her grandmother made strenuous efforts to foster her after the accident, which Aunt Gin concealed from Kinsey. Kinsey finally agreed to meet Grand at a family event where her grandmother, now very frail, mistook her for her mother. In W is for Wasted, the Millhone side of the family makes an appearance though this generally confirms Kinsey's negative feelings about family.

Stories featuring Kinsey Millhone

Alphabet mystery novels

"A" Is for Alibi (1982) (Kinsey is 32 years old in this first novel)
"B" Is for Burglar (1985)
"C" Is for Corpse (1986)
"D" Is for Deadbeat (1987)
"E" Is for Evidence (1988)
"F" Is for Fugitive (1989)
"G" Is for Gumshoe (1990) (Kinsey is 33)
"H" Is for Homicide (1991)
"I" Is for Innocent (1992)
"J" Is for Judgment (1993)
"K" Is for Killer (1994)
"L" Is for Lawless (1995)
"M" Is for Malice (1996)
"N" Is for Noose (1998)
"O" Is for Outlaw (1999)
"P" Is for Peril (2001)
"Q" Is for Quarry (2002)
"R" Is for Ricochet (2004)
"S" Is for Silence (2005)
"T" Is for Trespass (2007)
"U" Is for Undertow (2009)
"V" Is for Vengeance (2011) (Kinsey is 38)
"W" Is for Wasted (2013)
"X" (2015)
"Y" Is for Yesterday (2017)

When asked about the title of book 24, Grafton told the Minneapolis Star-Tribune that the title "almost has to be Xenophobe or Xenophobia. I've checked the penal codes in most states and xylophone isn't a crime, so I'm stuck." Ultimately, Grafton broke the usual title pattern, naming the 24th book simply "X".

Grafton had planned the twenty-sixth and final book in the series, titled "Z" Is for Zero, to be released in 2019. On Grafton's death in 2017, her daughter indicated that the final installment was unwritten and the family would not hire a ghostwriter, stating that "as far as we in the family are concerned, the alphabet now ends at Y."

According to Grafton, the 1981 book Telling Lies for Fun and Profit by prolific author Lawrence Block was her main creative guide during the "early years" of the Millhone novels. She re-read Block's advice book cover-to-cover before starting a new Millhone novel, and also wrote a new introduction for the 1994 reprint.<ref>Grafton, Sue (1994). "Introduction"; Block, Lawrence (1981, 1994). 'Telling Lies for Fun and Profit: A Manual for Fiction Writers, NY: William Morrow/Harper</ref>

Short storiesKinsey and Me (1992) – a collection of Kinsey Millhone short stories along with other short stories about Grafton's own mother, and a few non-fiction essays. It was originally published in 1991 (but without the stories concerning Grafton's mother; they were written later), by Bench Press, owned by Grafton's husband, Steven Humphrey. That limited publication ran to 326 copies (300 numbered and 26 lettered), and was re-published in January 2013 as a collection of the Kinsey short stories (including The Lying Game) plus stories depicting "Kit Blue", which involve a fictionalized version of Grafton's mother.
"The Lying Game" (2003) – a Kinsey Millhone short story which appeared in the September 2003 special 40th anniversary Lands' End catalogue. It also appeared as a separate pamphlet given to attendees at Malice Domestic 2011 conference, where Grafton was recognized for Lifetime Achievement. It is included in the 2013 version of Kinsey and Me''.

Kinsey Millhone in other works
Kinsey Millhone is featured in cameo appearances in crime novels by other authors. Bill Pronzini and Marcia Muller have their fictional detective spot Millhone at a convention in Chicago. Sara Paretsky has her sleuth V.I. Warshawski envy Millhone's organization.  Kinsey also makes a cameo appearance in "The Sultan of Byzantium" by Selçuk Altun.  As the story takes place in 2012, Kinsey is described: "As if her worn-out jeans and faded rose-colored t-shirt weren't enough, she made no attempt to hide the gray in her hair...she looked a little over fifty but didn't seem to care about that."

References

External links
Kinsey Millhone biography
Sue Grafton's official website

Fictional private investigators
Literary characters introduced in 1982
Characters in American novels of the 20th century
Characters in American novels of the 21st century
Fictional characters from California
Fictional people from the 20th-century